United Soccer League (USL), formerly known as United Soccer Leagues, is a soccer league in the United States and Canada. It organizes several men's and women's leagues, both professional and amateur. Men's leagues currently organized are the USL Championship, USL League One, USL League Two, and the youth Super Y League. A new women's league, the USL W League, began play in 2022. It is directly affiliated with the United States Soccer Federation and the United States Adult Soccer Association. The USL is headquartered in Tampa, Florida.

History

Year by year
 1986 – The original USL is established as the Southwest Indoor Soccer League.
 1989 – An outdoor league, known as the Southwest Outdoor Soccer League is added. 
 1990 – The indoor and outdoor leagues merge, becoming the Sunbelt Independent Soccer League.
 1991 – The SISL is renamed the United States Interregional Soccer League.
 1995 – The USISL is renamed the United States International Soccer League. Later that year, the USISL is renamed United Systems of Independent Soccer Leagues and formally establishes professional Pro League and amateur Premier Development League. The USL W-League women's semi-pro league is also launched.
 1996 – Select League is established consisting of strongest teams from Division 3 Pro League and Amateur Premier League in hopes of gaining Division 2 sanctioning.
 1997 – Select League and the former American Professional Soccer League merge to form A-League under the USISL umbrella.
 1999 – Umbrella USISL changes its name to the United Soccer Leagues.
 2009 – Nike sells organization to NuRock Soccer Holdings, LLC. As a result, nine clubs left the First Division to form the North American Soccer League: Atlanta Silverbacks, Carolina RailHawks FC, Miami FC, Minnesota Thunder, Montreal Impact, Rochester Rhinos, Tampa Bay Rowdies, Vancouver Whitecaps, and the AC St. Louis expansion group. The United Soccer League becomes a division in the temporary USSF Division 2 league, due to a dispute between the NASL and the USL over Division 2 status.
 2010 – The USL announce the formation of USL Pro, which merged the USL First Division and USL Second Division.
 2011 – The Inaugural season of USL Pro is held. The USL takes over operation of the Major Indoor Soccer League.
 2013 – USL Pro and Major League Soccer announce a multi-year agreement, beginning that season, to integrate MLS Reserve League play with USL Pro teams, first through team affiliations and "interleague" play, eventually fully merging MLS Reserves into the USL Pro structure. The W-20 League is launched, a youth league that is operationally aligned with the USL W-League.
 2015 – USL Pro is renamed the United Soccer League. The USL W-League and W-20 League cease operations.
 2017 – The USL is granted Provisional Division II status by U.S. Soccer. The USL also creates the USL Division III league, filing for Division III status with U.S. Soccer.
 2018 – The USL announces re-branding of its top league to the USL Championship, USL Division III to USL League One, and the Premier Development League to USL League Two beginning with the 2019 season.
 2021 – The USL announces two new women's competitions, the amateur W League launching in the 2022 season and the professional Super League launching in 2024.

Narrative
Founded in 1985 by Francisco Marcos, the Southwest Indoor Soccer League was first intended as a minor indoor league associated with Major Indoor Soccer League. The league began with five teams, all owned by individuals who owned or operated indoor soccer arenas in the Southwest United States. League headquarters was in Austin, Texas. In 1986, Marcos' team, the Austin Sockadillos, entered the league giving it six teams. By 1989, the league had set its sights on greater prospects than remaining a small, semi-professional indoor league. A 1989 press release stated, "It is envisioned the league will be part of the USSF's plan to professionalize soccer in the USA prior to the 1994 World Cup, and the league plans to push its teams to be considered for the "three-tiered first, second and third divisions" plan the USSF envisions for soccer."

Complete historical team list

UISL/USISL

Champions

Indoor seasons
The USL began operations in 1986 as the Southwest Indoor Soccer League, a semi-professional indoor league. The league quickly expanded and added an outdoor season in 1989.  In 1991, the league renamed itself the United States Interregional Soccer League. By then, the outdoor league overshadowed the indoor league which continued to slowly dwindle in importance. By the 1997–98 season, only five teams remained indoors while the outdoor season had over a hundred teams divided into a three-division structure. This led the league to stop running an indoor league.

In 2010, the USL began to consider relaunching an indoor season. However, it decided instead to take over operations of the Major Indoor Soccer League; beginning indoor operations in 2011. The champions were determined by a single games in 1987, 1988, 1992, 1993, 1994, 1995, 1996 and 1998.  The champions were determined by a best of three series in 1998 and a best of five series in 1989, 1990 and 1991 and a home-and-home series in 2012 and 2013.

Outdoor seasons 1989–2010
In 1989, the Southwest Indoor Soccer League added a summer, outdoor season known as the Southwest Outdoor Soccer League. In 1990, the league dropped both "indoor" and "outdoor" from its name as it ran both a semi-professional indoor and outdoor season. By 1995, the outdoor season had grown to such a size that the USISL, as it was known at the time, split the league into two levels, the aptly named, fully professional Professional League and the semi-professional Premier League. In 1996, the USISL added a third, higher, Select League. This was formed from the strongest teams from both the Professional and Premier League. The Select League, along with the competing A-League, both received official Division II status from FIFA. However, the A-League was in decline while the USISL was expanding. In 1997, the A-League ceased operations and merged into the USISL Select League which was renamed the USISL A-League. From that point, the USL's three-level structure remained stable until 2010. Some teams left to start the North American Soccer League and the First and Second Divisions were merged to become USL Pro.

Outdoor seasons 2011–2018

United Soccer League 2019–present

W-League seasons 1995–2015

W League seasons 2022–present

Staff
 Alec Papadakis – Chief executive officer
 Jake Edwards – President
 Justin Papadakis – Chief operating officer and chief real estate officer

References

External links
 

 
Companies based in Tampa, Florida
American companies established in 1986
Entertainment companies established in 1986
Soccer governing bodies in the United States
Soccer governing bodies in Canada